Michael Angelo Immenraet (18 October 1621, Antwerp – 1683, Utrecht), was a Flemish history and portrait painter who is mainly remembered for the lavish Baroque painting series of Biblical scenes which he produced for the Unionskirche, Idstein in Germany.

Life
Philips Augustijn Immenraet was born in Antwerp as the son of a German piano builder who had immigrated to Antwerp.  He was the older brother of the successful landscape painter Philips Augustijn Immenraet. It is not clear with whom he trained but on the basis of his style he is often regarded as a painter from the school of Peter Paul Rubens.

Immenraet married Maria Vergouwen, the sister of the painter Johanna Vergouwen on 8 February 1661. The couple had three daughters.  His wife died in 1664 upon giving birth to the third child. Immenraet and his sister-in-law Johanna Vergouwen engaged in extensive legislation regarding the inheritance of his deceased wife. On 26 November 1665 he married Margaretha Corthals and after her death he married a third time with Maria Brouwers.  He had four daughters and two sons from the three marriages.

Immenraet is documented in The Hague in 1661.  Here he paints a chimney piece for the 'Hofje van Nieuwkoop', a housing project for poor widows funded from the inheritance of Johan de Bruijn van Buijtewech, a rich citizen of The Hague.  The chimney piece represents the double portrait of Odila en Philippine van Wassenaer, the nieces of van Buijtewech and two first governesses of the project. The two young governesses are depicted as shepherdesses.

He was registered in the Antwerp Guild of Saint Luke in 1663.

He worked in Germany for a period where between 1673 and 1678.  He was responsible together with his pupil or assistant Johann Caspar Bencard for 38 of the oil on canvas paintings decorating the ceiling of the Unionskirche, Idstein.

Little is known about his later years except that he died in Utrecht.

Work
Michel Angelo Immenraet painted allegorical, history, religious and genre scenes as well as portraits. Aside from the painting cycle in the Unionskirche, Idstein not many of his works are known.

The earliest known work by him is the Double portrait of Odila en Phillipine van Wassenaer as Shepherdesses of 1661 ('Hofje van Nieuwkoop', The Hague).  The portrait depicts the two young governesses of het 'Hofje van Nieuwkoop' as shepherdesses in an Arcadian landscape.  This type of idealized representation was in vogue in the Dutch Republic at the time.

The best-known works from his oeuvre are the series of 38 paintings, which the realized with the assistance of Johann Caspar Bencard for the ceiling of the Unionskirche, Idstein. The commission was given by Johann of Nassau-Idstein (1603–77) who wished to turn the existing church into a Baroque "Predigt- und Hofkirche" (sermon and court church) after the Thirty Years' War. The Dutch painters Joachim von Sandrart and his nephew Johann von Sandrart also created paintings for the church. The difficulty for the artists was to create a language that corresponded to Lutheran sensitivities.  The programme of works all represent scenes from the Bible without any depictions of saints as would typically have been the case in a Catholic church.  The works represented the stories from the Bible as ever present, living realities.  The Biblical figures are dressed in courtly Baroque garments. The painting of the "Visitation" shows Mary arriving with a servant who carries her cases on his head.  Saint Elisabeth’s residence with its formal garden in the background resembles the Idstein residential palace of Johann of Nassau-Idstein, the construction of which was commenced in 1646. The subjects and the use of Baroque optical illusionism in the paintings in the center of the ceiling are intended to make the viewer look up, from altar to the back: The Transfiguration, the Elevation of the Holy Cross, The Resurrection, The Deposition, The Ascension and The Vision of St. John on Patmos.

A number of Immenraet’s compositions for the Unionskirche were based on well-known works by Rubens.  For instance The Wedding at Cana on the south wall is largely inspired by Rubens' painting The Feast of Herod which is in the collection of the National Gallery of Scotland in Edinburgh. The series of works were at the time regarded as a remarkably unique Baroque contribution to church decoration in Protestant Germany.

References

External links 
 
 Paintings in the Unionskirche

Flemish Baroque painters
Flemish portrait painters
Flemish history painters
Artists from Antwerp
Painters from Antwerp
1621 births
1683 deaths